The village of Alasay (Alah Say) is the center of Alasay District in Kapisa Province, Afghanistan.

The Battle of Alasay, codenamed Operation Dinner Out, was a military operation in Alasay which was carried out by French troops and the Afghan National Army (ANA) between the 14th and 23 March 2009. It left one French soldier killed, as well as 35 to 70 Taliban insurgents.

References 

Populated places in Kapisa Province